Eocaecilia is an extinct genus of gymnophionan amphibian from the early Jurassic Kayenta Formation of Arizona, United States. One species is described, Eocaecilia micropodia.

Eocaecilia shared some characteristics with salamanders and the now extinct microsaur amphibians. It was of small size, about 15 cm in length. Unlike modern caecilians, which are legless, Eocaecilia possessed small legs, and while modern caecilians have poorly developed eyes and spend a lot of time under ground, Eocaecilia'''s eyes were somewhat better developed. Although the precise ancestry of Eocaecilia'' is debated (and other caecilians by extension), it likely resided among the ancestral lepospondyl or temnospondyl amphibians of the Paleozoic and Mesozoic.

References

External links
Eocaecilia at Palaeos.com.

Gymnophiona
Jurassic amphibians of North America
Early Jurassic animals of North America
Prehistoric amphibian genera
Jurassic Arizona
Transitional fossils
Fossil taxa described in 1993
Early Jurassic amphibians